Saurenchelys lateromaculata is a species of eel in the family Nettastomatidae. It was described by Umberto D'Ancona in 1928, originally under the genus Leptocephalus. It is a marine, tropical eel which is known from the Indo-Western Pacific, including the South China Sea and possibly also the Red Sea.

References

Nettastomatidae
Fish described in 1928